The Henry T. Oxnard Historic District is a  historic district that was listed on the National Register of Historic Places in 1999.  Covering approximately F and G streets, between Palm and 5th streets, in the downtown core of Oxnard, California, the district includes 139 contributing buildings and includes homes mostly built before 1925. It includes Mission/Spanish Revival, Bungalow/craftsman, Colonial Revival, and other architecture. It includes five Prairie School and eight Tudor Revival homes.

It consists of the houses built in two sub-divisions:  the Henry T. Oxnard tract on F Street and the Walter H. Lathrop tract on G Street, which were built during 1909-1941 and with the "vast majority" built before 1925.  The two streets of homes are contiguous and "make an intact neighborhood that has remained unchanged for more than 70 years.... While many neighboring streets have some historic homes this is the only area that is unchanged and still has the spirit and feeling of the original turn-of-the-century city of Oxnard."

The district was developed in part by a number of Jewish immigrants from Alsace, France, whose families built businesses in Hueneme and then also in Oxnard.  These include Moise L. Wolff, Paul Lehmann (an owner of Lehman Brothers), Samuel Weill, and brothers-in-law Achille and Henry Levy. Samuel Weill, a partner in the Murphy & Weill Merchandise and Grocery of Oxnard built a large residence at 125 N. F street in the district;  Henry Levy built a large Craftsman/Tudor-style house at 155 S. G Street.  Also at least eight cashiers, tellers, and bookkeepers employed at the Bank of A. Levy or at a business of Henry Levy owned and/or occupied smaller homes in the district.

Neighborhood
The nearby J.A. Swartz Residence on 5th Street is among the finer examples of the Spanish Colonial Revival style among homes in the downtown core. Henry Levy House is a contributing property.

See also
National Register of Historic Places listings in Ventura County, California
 Ventura County Historic Landmarks & Points of Interest

References 

Houses in Ventura County, California
Houses completed in 1925
Houses on the National Register of Historic Places in California
National Register of Historic Places in Ventura County, California
Colonial Revival architecture in California
Mission Revival architecture in California
Prairie School architecture in California
Tudor Revival architecture in California
Historic districts on the National Register of Historic Places in California
Neighborhoods in Ventura County, California